Athens of the West may refer to:

 Angers, Maine-et-Loire, France
 Cincinnati, Ohio
 Faribault, Minnesota
 Jacksonville, Illinois
 Lexington, Kentucky
 Old Pasadena, in Pasadena, California
 Carmarthen, in Wales, United Kingdom
 Athens, Georgia
 Sacramento

See also
 West Athens (disambiguation)